Tenille is a given name. Notable people with the name include:

 Tenille Arts (born 1994), Canadian singer
 Tenille Campbell, Canadian poet and photographer
 Tenille Averil Dashwood (born 1989), Australian professional wrestler
 Tenille Swartz (born 1987), South African professional squash player
 Tenille Townes (born 1994), Canadian singer
Tenille Peterson, daughter of mall saleswoman Tanya Peterson of Freeform's 2021 miniseries Cruel Summer

See also
 Toni Tennille (born 1940), American musician